The 2003 IBF World Championships (World Badminton Championships) were held in the National Indoor Arena, Birmingham, United Kingdom, between 28 July and 3 August 2003. The championships had originally been planned to take place from 12 May-18 May, but were rescheduled following the international outbreak of SARS.

This edition also rewarded the points for the players to collected for the qualification to 2004 Summer Olympics in Athens, Greece.

Host city selection
International Badminton Federation decided to split the IBF World Championships and the Sudirman Cup as separate tournaments starting from 2003. Canada, China, England, Hong Kong, and the Netherlands were the countries interested in hosting the tournaments. England later announced as host for the first standalone world championships.

Medalists

Medal table

Events

References

External links
 tournamentsoftware.com

 
World Championships
2003 in English sport
Badminton tournaments in England
BWF World Championships
International sports competitions in Birmingham, West Midlands